Sagaing is the former capital of the Sagaing Region of Myanmar. It is located in the Irrawaddy River,  to the south-west of Mandalay on the opposite bank of the river. Sagaing with numerous Buddhist monasteries is an important religious and monastic centre. The pagodas and monasteries crowd the numerous hills along the ridge running parallel to the river. The central pagoda, Soon U Ponya Shin Pagoda, is connected by a set of covered staircases that run up the  hill.

Today, with about 70,000 inhabitants, the city is part of Mandalay built-up area with more than 1,022,000 inhabitants estimated in 2011. The city is a frequent tourist destination of day trippers. Within the city are the Sagaing Institute of Education, the Sagaing Education College, Sagaing University, Technological University (Sagaing), and co-operative university (Sagaing).

Sagaing University was established on 11 February 2012. It is in Pakatoe Quarter, Sagaing Township, Sagaing Region, Myanmar. As a result, there are now five colleges/university in Sagaing.

Name
The classical name of Sagaing is Zeyapura, which literally translates to "city of victory."

History
Sagaing was the capital of Sagaing Kingdom (1315-1364), one of the minor kingdoms that rose up after the fall of Pagan dynasty, where one of Thihathu's sons, Athinkhaya, established himself. During the Ava period (1364-1555), the city was the common fief of the crown prince or senior princes.  During the reign of King Naungdawgyi. Sagaing briefly became the royal capital between 1760 and 1763.

On 8 August 1988, Sagaing was the site of demonstrations which were concluded by a massacre in which around 300 civilians were killed.

Climate
Located in the rain shadow of the Arakan Mountains, Sagaing has a borderline hot semi-arid climate (Köppen BSh) just short of a tropical savanna climate (Aw). The city receives less than a third as much rainfall as Chittagong at a similar latitude on the Bay of Bengal. Unlike most monsoonal semi-arid climates, the rainy season is relatively long at around five to six months, while variability and extreme monthly and daily rainfalls are much lower than usual with this type of climate.

People
 Sithu Kyawhtin, King of Ava (1552-1555)
 Zhu Youlang, Prince of Gui, last Ming Dynasty claimant to China, lived in exile at Sagaing in 1661
 Maurice Collis, author of Trials in Burma, district commissioner of the Sagaing district in 1928
 Tom Mitford, brother of the Mitford Sisters, was killed while serving with the Devonshire Regiment at Sagaing in 1945.

Places of interest
The Kaunghmudaw Pagoda (Burmese:  ; Yaza Mani Sula Kaunghmudaw; Pali: Rājamaṇicūḷā) is a large pagoda on the northwestern outskirts of Sagaing.

Images

See also
 List of kings of Sagaing Kingdom

References

Township capitals of Myanmar
Populated places in Sagaing Region
Buddhist pilgrimage sites in Myanmar